Philochortus intermedius, the southern orangetail lizard or  Boulenger's shield-backed lizard, is a species of lizard found in Somalia and Ethiopia.

References

Philochortus
Reptiles described in 1917
Taxa named by George Albert Boulenger